Beatrix of the Netherlands has held numerous titles and honours, both during, before, and after her reign, including a number of historical titles.

Titles and styles
 31 January 1938 – 30 April 1980: Her Royal Highness Princess Beatrix of the Netherlands, Princess of Orange-Nassau, Princess of Lippe-Biesterfeld
 30 April 1980 – 30 April 2013: Her Majesty The Queen
 30 April 2013 – present: Her Royal Highness Princess Beatrix of the Netherlands, Princess of Orange-Nassau, Princess of Lippe-Biesterfeld

Beatrix's full regnal title was: 

It was usually shortened to: "Beatrix, by the Grace of God, Queen of the Netherlands, Princess of Orange-Nassau, etc, etc, etc."

National honours, other honours, medals and degree

:  Patron of the Teutonic Order of Bailiwick of Utrecht
:  Honorary Commander of the Order of Saint John in the Netherlands

Honorary degree
 : Doctor honoris causa of the Leiden University, 8 February 2005

Foreign honours and award

Foreign honours
 : 
 Grand Star of the Order of Honour for Services to the Republic of Austria, Special Class
 : 
 Knight Grand Cross of the Order of Leopold I
 : 
 Grand Cross with Collar of the Order of the Southern Cross
 : 
 Member Grand Cross with Collar of the Order of the Crown
 : 
 Grand Cross of the Order of the Balkan Mountains
 : 
 Grand Cross with Collar of the Order of the Merit of Chile
 : 
 Knight of the Order of the Elephant
 : 
 Grand Cross with Collar of the Order of the Cross of Terra Mariana
  Ethiopian Imperial family:
 Knight Grand Cordon of the Order of the Queen of Sheba
 : 
  Grand Cross with Collar of the Order of the White Rose of Finland
 : 
  Grand Cross of the Order of the Legion of Honour
 : 
 Grand Cross Special Class of the Order of Merit of the Federal Republic of Germany
 : 
 Grand Cross of the Order of the Star of Ghana
 Greece:
  Greek Royal Family:
  Dame Grand Cross of the Royal Order of Saints Olga and Sophia, Special Class
 :
  Grand Cross of the Order of the Redeemer
 : 
  Grand Cross with Collar Order of the Falcon
 : 
 First Class (Adipurna) of the Star of the Republic of Indonesia
 First Class (Adipurna) of the Order of the Star of Mahaputera
  Iranian Imperial Family: 
 Member Grand Cordon of the Imperial Order of the Pleiades, Special Class
 :
  Grand Cross with Collar of the Order of Merit of the Italian Republic
 : 
 Knight Grand Cross of Honour and Devotion of the Sovereign Military Order of Malta
 : 
 Grand Cross of the Order of the Ivory Coast
 : 
 Knight Grand Cordon with Collar of the Order of the Chrysanthemum
 : 
 Member Grand Cordon with Collar of the Order of al-Hussein bin Ali
 : 
 Commander Grand Cross with Collar of the Order of Three Stars
 : 
 Grand Cross of the Order of the Pioneers of Liberia
 : 
 Grand Cross with Collar of the Order of Vytautas the Great
 : 
 Knight of the Order of the Gold Lion of the House of Nassau
 Knight Grand Cross of the Order of Adolphe of Nassau
 Knight Grand Cross of the Order of the Oak Crown
 : 
 Grand Cross with Collar of the Order of the Aztec Eagle
 : 
 Knight Grand Cross with Collar of the Order of Saint Olav
 : 
 Member Grand Cordon with Collar of the Order of Al-Said
 : 
 Grand Cross of the Order of the Sun
 : 
 Grand Cross of the Order of the White Eagle
 :
 Grand Cross with Collar of the Order of Prince Henry
 : 
 Member Grand Cordon with Collar of the Order of Independence
 : 
 Grand Cross with Collar of the Order of the Star of Romania
 : 
 Grand Cross of the Order of the Lion
 : 
 Grand Cross of the Order of the White Double Cross
 : 
 Grand Cross of the Order of Good Hope
 : 
 1, 187th Knight of the Order of the Golden Fleece
 Knight Grand Cross of the Order of Isabella the Catholic
 : 
 Grand Cross of the Order of the Yellow Star
 : 
 Member Grand Cross with Collar of the Royal Order of the Seraphim
 Recipient of the 50th Birthday Badge Medal of King Carl XVI Gustaf
 Recipient of the 70th Birthday Badge Medal of King Carl XVI Gustaf
 : 
 Knight of the Order of the Rajamitrabhorn
 Knight of the Order of the Royal House of Chakri
 : 
 Grand Cordon of the Order of the Republic
 : 
 Member of the Decoration of the State of the Republic of Turkey
 : 
 Grand Cross with Collar of the Order of Zayed
 : 
 Stranger Lady of the Order of the Garter (8th Lady since 1901; 1989)
 Recipient of the Royal Victorian Chain (1982)
 Honorary Dame Grand Cross of the Royal Victorian Order (1958)
: 
 Grand Cross with Collar of the Order of the Liberator
 Socialist Federal Republic of Yugoslavia: 
 Grand Cross of the Order of the Yugoslav Star

Foreign awards
 : Recipient of the Charlemagne Prize - 16 May 1996

References

Onderscheidingen Koningin Beatrix - website Alles op een rij (Dutch)

List Of Titles And Honours Of Beatrix Of The Netherlands
List Of Titles And Honours Of Beatrix Of The Netherlands

Recipients of the Grand Star of the Decoration for Services to the Republic of Austria
Honorary Knights Grand Cross of the Royal Victorian Order
Recipients of the Collar of the Order of the Cross of Terra Mariana
Grand Croix of the Légion d'honneur
Honorary Companions of the Order of the Star of Ghana
Knights Grand Cross with Collar of the Order of Merit of the Italian Republic
Grand Crosses with Golden Chain of the Order of Vytautas the Great
Grand Crosses of the Order of the Sun of Peru
Grand Collars of the Order of Prince Henry
Knights of the Golden Fleece of Spain
Knights Grand Cross of the Order of Isabella the Catholic
Grand Cordons of the Honorary Order of the Yellow Star
Grand Crosses Special Class of the Order of Merit of the Federal Republic of Germany
First Class of the Order of the Star of Romania
Recipients of the Order of the White Eagle (Poland)